The house at 5 Willow Court in Arlington, Massachusetts is a rare local example of Second Empire styling.

Description and history 
The house originally stood on Massachusetts Avenue (its construction date is not known), and was moved to its present site as that road developed more commercially in the 1930s. It has a mansard roof typical of the style, and its windows are topped by eared surrounds. The mansard roof is flared at the base, with a bracketed eave, and is pierced by gabled dormers.

The house was listed on the National Register of Historic Places on April 18, 1985.

See also
National Register of Historic Places listings in Arlington, Massachusetts

References

Houses on the National Register of Historic Places in Arlington, Massachusetts
Houses in Arlington, Massachusetts
Second Empire architecture in Massachusetts